Wooded Island is an island off the coast of Western Australia. The area is 0.17 square kilometers. It is part of the Houtman Abrolhos.

References

Islands of the Houtman Abrolhos